Classroom of the Elite is an anime series adapted from the light novel of the same name, and written by Shōgo Kinugasa and illustrated by Shunsaku Tomose. The first season of the series was directed by Seiji Kishi and Hiroyuki Hashimoto, with Aoi Akashiro handled the series composition, Kazuaki Morita designed the characters, and Ryo Takahashi composed the music. The opening theme "Caste Room" was performed by ZAQ, while the ending theme "Beautiful Soldier" was performed by Minami. Crunchyroll streamed the series with subtitles, and Funimation streamed the English dub. The season was produced by Lerche and aired from July 12 to September 27, 2017 on AT-X and other channels.


Episode list

Notes

Title's Quotes

References

External links
  
 

1
2017 Japanese television seasons